Glenridge may refer to:

 Glenridge, a community in the city of St. Catharines, Ontario, Canada
 Glenridge Middle School, a public middle school in Orlando, Florida, United States

See also
Glen Ridge (disambiguation)
Glenridge Park, California